Ourapteryx similaria is a moth of the family Geometridae first described by John Henry Leech in 1897. It is found in China and Taiwan.

Subspecies
Ourapteryx similaria similaria (China)
Ourapteryx similaria brachycerca Wehrli, 1939 (China)
Ourapteryx similaria horishana Matsumura, 1910 (Taiwan)

References

Moths described in 1897
Ourapterygini